The 2002–03 British National League season was the seventh season of the British National League, the second level of ice hockey in Great Britain. 10 teams participated in the league, and the Coventry Blaze won the championship.

Regular season

Playoffs

Group A

Group B

Semifinals 
 Coventry Blaze - Guildford Flames 4:2, 5:1
 Cardiff Devils - Dundee Stars 5:3, 3:4 OT

Final 
 Coventry Blaze - Cardiff Devils 3:2, 2:1

External links 
 Season on hockeyarchives.info

British National League (1996–2005) seasons
United
2